Euclides da Cunha (January 20, 1866 – August 15, 1909) was a Brazilian journalist, sociologist and engineer. His most important work is Os Sertões (Rebellion in the Backlands), a non-fictional account of the military expeditions promoted by the Brazilian government against the rebellious village of Canudos, known as the War of Canudos.

This book was a favorite of Robert Lowell, who ranked it above Tolstoy. Jorge Luis Borges also commented on it in his short story "Three Versions of Judas". The book was translated into English by Samuel Putnam and published by the University of Chicago Press in 1944. It remains in print. He was heavily influenced by Naturalism and its Darwinian proponents. Os Sertões characterised the coast of Brazil as a chain of civilisations while the interior remained more primitive. He occupied the 7th chair of the Brazilian Academy of Letters from 1903 until his death in 1909.

He served as inspiration for the character of The Journalist in Mario Vargas Llosa's The War of the End of the World.

Timeline

Euclides da Cunha was born January 20, 1866, in Cantagalo, Rio de Janeiro, Brazil, where he lived until he was three years old. His grandparents were of Portuguese origin. He attended in 1885 Escola Politécnica, and after he attended  Escola Militar da Praia Vermelha, a military school in Rio, beginning in 1886. He was expelled from the military school in 1888, due to his participation in an act of protest during a visit of the Brazilian War Minister, who was a member of the last Conservative cabinet of the Brazilian Empire. He was readmitted to the Escola Militar in 1889. He was admitted to the Brazilian War School (Escola de Guerra) in 1891 . He was discharged from the Army in 1896 in order to dedicate himself to studying civil engineering.

In 1897 he accompanied the Army in the Campanha de Canudos, against a rebellious group of peasants under the leadership of Antonio Conselheiro.  Between 7 August and 1 October, he was in the Sertão ("backland"), as war correspondent for the  O Estado de S. Paulo newspaper. In 1903 he was elected to the Academia Brasileira de Letras (Brazilian Academy of Letters) and the Instituto Histórico e Geográfico, the Historical and Geographic Institute In 1909 he was admitted as chairman and professor of Logic at the Colégio Pedro II, a public secondary school in Rio.

Euclides da Cunha married Ana Emília Ribeiro, daughter of major Sólon Ribeiro, in 1890. The couple had five children. Ana Emília had an affair with Dilermando de Assis, a young Army lieutenant. On August 15, 1909, finding about his wife's affair, da Cunha went to Assis' house to kill him. He shot Assis and his brother Dinorah, failing to kill either. Assis shot da Cunha when Euclides had already left his house, and the writer was killed. According to historian Susanna Hecht's account, there was doubt whether Dilermando murdered a fleeing man who had run out of bullets, or whether Euclides still was a threat to Dilermando (which would make the murder self-defense.) The jury decided for the latter scenario and acquitted Dilermando.  Da Cunha was 43 years old.

Works
1902 Os Sertões (Rebellion in the Backlands: University of Chicago Press  ) -- also Penguin Classics in a new translation, 
1907 Contrastes e confrontos, lit. Contrasts and Confrontations
1907 Peru versus Bolívia
1939 Canudos, diário de uma expedição – news articles published in the periodical O Estado de S. Paulo
1967 Canudos e inéditos – news articles published by the periodical O Estado de S. Paulo

Further reading
 Goldberg, Isaac (1922). "Euclides da Cunha." In: Brazilian Literature. New York: Alfred A. Knoff, pp. 210–221.

References

External links

 Euclides da Cunha site, Biography and works (in Portuguese)
 Casa Euclidiana, São José do Rio Pardo, São Paulo, Brazil (in Portuguese)
 Short biography in English (down the article)
 
 

1866 births
1909 deaths
Deaths by firearm in Brazil
Brazilian male writers
Members of the Brazilian Academy of Letters
Brazilian people of Portuguese descent
People from Cantagalo, Rio de Janeiro